The New York State Division of Military and Naval Affairs (NYS DMNA) is responsible for the state's New York Army National Guard, New York Air National Guard, New York Guard and the New York Naval Militia. It is headed by Adjutant General of New York Major General Raymond F. Shields Jr., appointed on October 1, 2018. with the Governor of New York Kathy Hochul serving as Commander in Chief of the state's militia forces. It is part of the New York State Executive Department.

All of the armories in New York State are run directly or indirectly by the Division of Military and Naval Affairs.
The DMNA headquarters, located in Latham, New York near Albany, is within 8 miles of both the Knolls Atomic Power Laboratory and the General Electric Research and Development facility in Niskayuna, New York.

New York National Guard

The Constitution of the United States specifically charges the "Militia of the Several States," now embodied as the National Guard, with dual federal and state missions. In fact, the National Guard is the only United States military force empowered to function in a state status. Those functions range from limited actions during non-emergency situations to full scale law enforcement of martial law when local law enforcement officials can no longer maintain civil control.

The New York National Guard consists of the New York Army National Guard and the New York Air National Guard.

The Governor may call individuals or units of the New York National Guard into service during emergencies or to assist in special situations which lend themselves to use of the National Guard. The state mission assigned to the National Guard is:
"To provide trained and disciplined forces for domestic emergencies or as otherwise provided by state law."

The National Guard may be called into federal service in response to a call by the President or Congress.

When National Guard troops are called to federal service, the President serves as Commander-in-Chief. The federal mission assigned to the National Guard is: "To provide properly trained and equipped units for prompt mobilization for war, National emergency or as otherwise needed."

Unlike United States Army Reserve members, National Guard members cannot be mobilized individually (except through voluntary transfers and Temporary Duty Assignments (TDYs), but only as part of their respective units. However, there have been a significant number of individual activations to support military operations after the September 11 terrorist attacks; the legality of this policy is a major issue within the National Guard.

New York Guard
The state defense force of New York is the New York Guard, a military entity authorized by both the State Code of New York and executive order. The New York Guard is the state's authorized militia and assumes the state mission of the New York National Guard in the event the Guard is mobilized. The New York Guard comprises a large number of retired active and reserve military personnel and selected professionals who volunteer their time and talents in further service to their state.

New York Naval Militia
The New York Naval Militia is the naval militia of New York, and serves as the naval equivalent of the National Guard. As a federally-recognized naval militia, 95% of members of the naval militia must also be members of the United States Navy Reserve or the United States Marine Corps Reserve. Since 1997, New York has allowed members of the United States Coast Guard Reserve to join the naval militia as well.

Previous Chiefs of Staff to the Governor
Karl F. Hausauer, Major General, circ. 1949

New York Aid to Civil Authority Medal

The New York Aid to Civil Authority Medal is an award of the State of New York given to the New York State Organized Militia. The New York Aid to Civil Authority Ribbon is awarded any member of the New York Organized Militia who performs any period of state active duty.

For each succeeding award, a medal device (shield) will be attached to the suspension ribbon and service ribbon. These devices shall be:
 
Silver (to represent one additional award) 
gold (to represent five additional awards)

New York Counterdrug Service Ribbon

The New York Counterdrug Ribbon is an award of the New York National Guard.  The New York Counterdrug Ribbon is awarded to any member of the New York State Organized Militia who satisfactorily  completes thirty days of service related to counter-drug operations.  Time spent at the National Interagency Counterdrug Institute does not count towards this award's eligibility requirement.

New York Exercise Support Ribbon

The New York Exercise Support Ribbon is a decoration of the state of New York awarded to members of the New York National Guard. The New York Exercise Support Ribbon is awarded to members of the New York Army National Guard and New York Air National Guard who participate in military exercises directed by the Joint Chiefs of Staff. Subsequent awards of this ribbon are denoted by a silver 'E' device worn on the ribbon; groups of five awards are represented by gold 'E' devices.

References

External links
Division of Military and Naval Affairs
 Division of Military and Naval Affairs in the New York Codes, Rules and Regulations
New York Army National Guard
New York Air National Guard
New York State Guard
New York Naval Militia
Bibliography of New York Army National Guard History compiled by the United States Army Center of Military History

Military in New York (state)
New York National Guard
State agencies of New York (state)
1917 establishments in New York (state)